Octávio Mobiglia (April 9, 1931 – March 2015) was an Olympic breaststroke swimmer from Brazil, who participated at two Summer Olympics for his native country. He was born in Ribeirão Preto. At the 1952 Summer Olympics in Helsinki, he swam the 200-metre breaststroke, not reaching the finals. At the 1956 Summer Olympics in Melbourne, he swam the 200-metre breaststroke, not reaching the finals, being disqualified.

References

1931 births
2015 deaths
Brazilian male breaststroke swimmers
Swimmers at the 1952 Summer Olympics
Swimmers at the 1956 Summer Olympics
Olympic swimmers of Brazil
Sportspeople from São Paulo (state)
20th-century Brazilian people